Akola may refer to:

 Akola, a city in the state of Maharashtra, India
 Akola district, a district of the state of Maharashtra, India
 Akola (Lok Sabha constituency), a Lok Sabha constituency of Maharashtra, India
 Akola Airport
 Akola Fort
 Akola, Agra, in Uttar Pradesh, India
 Akola, Chittorgarh, a village in Rajasthan

See also